The Metropolitan Transit Authority of Harris County (stylized as METRO) is a major public transportation agency based in Houston, Texas, United States. It operates bus, light rail, bus rapid transit, HOV and HOT lanes, and paratransit service (under the name METROLift) in the city as well as most of Harris County. It also operates bus service to two cities in Fort Bend County, and to Conroe in Montgomery County. The Metro headquarters are in the Lee P. Brown Administration Building in Downtown Houston.

History 

The Texas State Legislature authorized the creation of local transit authorities in 1973. In 1978, Houston-area voters created Metro and approved a one-cent sales tax to support its operations. Metro opened for business in January 1979, taking over the bus service owned by the City of Houston known as HouTran. HouTran was plagued by outdated equipment, infrequent service and a route structure which failed to account for Houston's rapid population growth.

Metro's service area encompasses  and also serves portions of an eight-county region with its vanpool service; the agency employs about 3,800 people.

Executive leadership 
Tom Lambert is the current President and CEO of the agency. Lambert was formally appointed in February 2014, although he had been operating as the agency's interim CEO since the beginning of 2013. Lambert, a Houston native with a political science degree from Southwest Texas State University and master's in public administration from the University of Houston, joined Metro as a security investigator in 1979. He was named agency police chief in 1982, ultimately overseeing close to 100 officers, then moved into higher ranks of management.

The Metro Board has nine members – five are appointed by the Mayor and confirmed by Houston City Council, two are appointed by Harris County Commissioners Court, and two are appointed by the 14 mayors of Metro's smaller city members.

Metro Bus 

Metro's local bus service usually runs on city streets, typically stopping at every other corner along its entire route. The bus system is the most used in Texas and the Southwest region. Metro also operates express bus routes on the Houston region's freeway high-occupancy vehicle lanes, which stop at park-and-ride lots.

Prior to the construction of Metrorail, Metro consisted of the largest all-bus fleet in the United States, only because Houston was the largest major city devoid of any rail transit since 1990.

Circa 1991 bus services for handicapped people were implemented.

In 2015, the bus system was redesigned, eliminating low-ridership routes in favor of a high-frequency, high-demand bus network. This change was accomplished without any increase in operating costs.

Service types 

Local: Most Metro buses typically operate on city streets, with the majority of routes serving several of Houston's major employment centers. The routes are grid-like "crosstown" routes that travel from one part of the city to another, typically without entering downtown. Many routes were truncated to METRORail stations to eliminate duplicate service.
Express: A local limited stop service that serves key destinations but travel nonstop on freeway segments. They were formerly categorized as Limited prior to the 2015 restructuring of bus routes.
Park and Ride (Commuter): Metro operates express service between major destinations and outlying areas via high-occupancy vehicle lanes on regional freeways. Buses on these routes stop at park-and-ride lots, which also serve as transit centers.
402 Bellaire Quickline: A pilot program introduced on June 1, 2009, to provide faster service with upgraded buses and fewer, more modern stops to busy corridors, beginning with a replacement of Route 2 (Bellaire).

Routes 

Metro's bus routes are numbered based on their service type and arranged in a grid. On August 24, 2015, Metro revamped their entire bus network with new routes and frequent service. Under the new network, all local routes run 7 days a week with the exception of two express routes.

Metro provides the free Greenlink shuttle services in Downtown Houston, represented by routes 412 and 413.

Metro's express and commuter buses consist of  MCI and New Flyer "Viking" buses, which have reclining seats, small individual lights, as well as small air conditioning vents for each seat. Viking buses went out of service in May 2015.

Transit centers 
Acres Home
Bellaire
Burnett
Downtown
Eastwood
Fannin South
Fifth Ward
Greenspoint
Hiram Clarke
Hobby
Kashmere
Magnolia
Mesa
Mission Bend
Northline
Northwest
Tidwell
Southeast
Tidwell
Texas Medical Center
West Loop
Westpark/Lower Uptown
Wheeler Station

Park and Ride lots 

Metro operates 28 different park and ride locations.

Advertising policy 
Metro has had a policy since its founding in which it refuses to place advertisements on buses, claiming that such a move would create an unsightly appearance on the buses. Metro had originally attempted to generate extra revenue by only advertising in its bus shelters, but a city ordinance blocked the decision. After a failed attempt to get permission to partially use advertisements on buses, Metro has since decided to continue enforcing its policy.

Due to the lack of funding for METRORail expansion, the policy has been proposed to be expanded to light rail vehicles in order to generate additional revenue. Metro began advertising the Houston Zoo on the side of three light rail vehicles in 2010. In late September 2010, due to the decreased budget, Metro began to seriously consider advertising on their buses.

Rates 
In the fall of 2006, Metro revealed plans to rework its fare system. The new system involves pre-paid fare cards (contactless smart cards), called Q Cards, that can be recharged on local buses and Metro TVMs. 3-hour passes are electronically added to the card each time it is used. Frequent users get "Rider Rewards" that offer five free rides for every 50 paid trips.

Senior citizens 65–69 will continue to receive a discounted rate as will disabled patrons. Senior citizens over 70 may ride for free. Children under 5 also ride for free when accompanied by an adult (limit 3). This was intended to keep the base fare low and phase out the previous fare system consisting of transfers (was reinstated from July 2015 to March 2016), as well as day (reinstated on October 7, 2013), weekly, monthly and annual passes, which occurred in early 2008. On November 2, 2008, local fares increased to $1.25 from $1. Currently another fare increase is being mulled as a means to pay for constructing the expansion of the light rail.

HOV system 

Metro has been known for pioneering the use of express buses in HOV lanes. This was part of the reversible HOV lane concept that began in 1979 with the completion of the North Freeway (I-45) Contraflow Lane. This concept used the inside freeway lane of the "opposite" direction separated by traffic pylons and is closed to all vehicles except buses and vanpools. Although a head-on collision involving a car and a bus occurred in 1980, the concept became permanent, but with the HOV lanes separated from the rest of traffic with Jersey barriers.

The HOV lanes run between Downtown Houston (inbound A.M. and outbound P.M.) and the suburbs and are found on portions of the Katy Freeway, Gulf Freeway, North Freeway, Southwest Freeway, Eastex Freeway and Northwest Freeway.

Since Metro Express buses use them during rush hour, most routes lead to the Park and Ride lots and use "secret" HOV lane exits (often elevated T-intersections) that lead to the lots (also used by vehicles as well) without having to exit the freeway to street intersections. The HOV system will soon get an overhaul in the event of major freeway construction to take place in Houston and may have HOV lanes in both directions with the concept of HOT (Toll) lanes introduced.

In 2011, Metro began conversion of the HOV lanes to High Occupancy Toll (HOT) lanes. Commuters with only one person in a vehicle will be able to pay a toll to use the lanes when the conversion is complete.

METROLift 

Metro Lift provides transportation needs for people with a disability, who cannot board, or ride from a regular Metro bus. The Metro Lift vehicles are shared-ride, meaning that they take multiple customers and groups. Metro tells its customers to use standard Metro bus services whenever possible. Metro Lift uses special vehicles that are distinct from fixed-route Metro buses. The Authority's METROLift paratransit service will have provided 1.9 million trips to 16,178 eligible riders in FY2017, using both METRO-owned lift-equipped vans and contractor-owned and operated accessible minivans.

METRORail 

Metro's light rail service is known as METRORail.

Metro offers a trip planner on its web site that provides information for public transit in the region it serves. It is multi-modal, combining schedule information for buses and rail. Riders enter their intended origin and destination, along with optional time, date, the trip planner displays, itineraries showing the stops, departure and arrival times, times to get from the origin to the destination and other information.

Today, the average daily weekday ridership is 59,753 and 18.3 million annually. On November 9, 2007, Metro surpassed its 40 million boardings mark, something it did not expect to happen until 2020. Notable records in ridership have occurred on the following dates:
February 1, 2004: 64,005 passengers rode Metro during Super Bowl XXXVIII
February 23, 2004: 54,193 passenger boardings were recorded, the highest weekday at the time
February 27, 2007: 56,388 passengers were recorded the day of the Houston Livestock Show and Rodeo
 February 4, 2017: 109,417 passengers were recorded during pre-Super Bowl festivities.
November 3, 2017: 125,000 passengers were recorded the day of the Houston Astros World Series Championship Parade

METRORail lines 

Metro currently operates three light rail lines: the Red Line, Purple Line and Green Line. The Red Line, the Authority's first light rail line, began operation on January 1, 2004. Now extended to 12.8 miles, the line begins at the Northline Transit Center, serving HCC Northeast and Northline Commons mall, and then continues south through Houston's Central Business District, Midtown, the Museum District, Rice University, the Texas Medical Center and the NRG Park Complex to the Fannin South Transit Center  It is the second major light rail service in Texas following the DART system. The arrival of Metro light rail comes approximately sixty years after the previous streetcar system was shut down, which left Houston as the largest city in the United States without a rail system since 1990, when Los Angeles' Blue Line opened.

Metro opened two additional light rail lines in 2015, the Purple (Southeast) and Green (East End) Lines. Destinations served by these new lines include Texas Southern University, the University of Houston, PNC Stadium, and the Theater District. These new lines added another 9.9 miles of light rail. In total, Metro operates 22.7 miles of light rail service. Metro will reach approximately 18.6 million light rail boardings in FY17.

Two other lines were to be completed by 2012, but funding issues dropped the number to the northern extension of the Red Line and two of the original four new lines. The extension of the Red Line was opened on December 21, 2013 and the East End/Green Line opened on May 23, 2015. Due to federal investigations and the lack of funds, the plans may degenerate further. Three of the five lines were previously going to be bus-rapid transit, but due to high ridership possibilities, the decision was made to make them all light rail.

Expansion 

Additional rail will be laid as approved by a 52% yes to 48% no margin in the November 2003 election. Critics have alleged the existence of a conflict of interest in the planned expansion. Major contractors including Siemens AG, which constructs the train vehicles, contributed substantial amounts of money to the Political Action Committee promoting the expansion referendum. Supporters of an expanded rail system in Houston have leveled similar charges against opponents of the referendum, noting that suburban development interests largely bankrolled the PAC opposing the referendum.

In June 2005, Metro announced a revised plan for expansion of the METRORail system. The plan included four new corridors, consisting of both light rail and bus rapid transit. The bus rapid transit lines would have later been converted into light rail when ridership warranted the conversion.

On October 18, 2007, the plan was revised to allow for the possibility of more federal funding. Metro decided to have all the lines consist of light rail from the start.

The planned expansions are within the city of Houston and will eventually reach the two major Houston airports, George Bush Intercontinental Airport and William P. Hobby Airport. Metro is planning service to suburbs in Houston, as well as other parts of Houston. Alternatives Analysis and Draft Environmental Impact Analysis studies are currently underway on four extensions.

Metro is also planning a commuter rail system in conjunction with the light rail system, pending feasibility of the plan. In addition, Metro wants to link up with a planned Commuter Rail line traveling from Fort Bend County to just south of Reliant Stadium, which would use an existing Union Pacific railroad, as well as an additional line branching out along the U.S. Highway 290 corridor to Hempstead, TX and possibly further. A recent entrance by the Gulf Coast Freight Rail District may make the 290 corridor and the Galveston corridor possible by 2012, again pending feasibility. While heavy rail would not be a possibility to serve Fort Bend County, recent approval has been given to study an extension of the Red Line to Fort Bend from the Fannin South Station. Furthermore, Representative Gene Greene has issued a statement regarding a preliminary acquisition of funds for Houston projects, amongst them one million dollars to move forward and extend the Red Line southwest to Missouri City.

The passed voter referendum included:

Additional  of light rail
Commuter rail service (28 miles)
Increased access to activity centers
Rail service to both airports
More than 50 new rail stations
50% increase in bus service

The following lines and services were planned to be up and running by 2012, but various circumstances have changed the overall timing. According to a statement by Annise Parker, Houston's mayor, both the University Line and the Uptown Line would be delayed until a future date when funding could be secured. According to construction details from the GO METRORail website, construction was moving slowly. Further delays to the construction were also a possibility pending the FTA investigation Metro (which began in April 2010) for possible "Buy America" violations by building new prototype cars in Spain. Another obstacle surfaced in August 2010 when Metro officially announced that it had fallen short $49 million on its budget, but insisted that the current dates for completion (Red Line Extension by 2013 and East End/Green Line by 2015) would not be affected. However, such was not the case, after the decision handed down by the FTA on September 8, 2010, that stated that Metro was in violation of "Buy America" rules – after talking with the board, on September 9, 2010, all progress for the three light rail lines under construction was to be slowed and a new (generic) date of 2014 was set.

The current plans to date are as follows:

 The Red Line Extension from UH–Downtown to the Northline Transit Center that runs .
 The East End/Green Line extends east  from Downtown Houston to Altic/Howard Hughes
 The Southeast/Purple Line extends  from downtown at Smith Street (near the Main Street line) and terminates at Palm Center around MLK and Griggs Street.
 The University/Blue Line (according to Go METRORail) will extend  from the Hillcroft Transit Center to the Eastwood Transit Center, and follow the Richmond/Wheeler and Westpark corridors with transfers to the Red Line at Wheeler Station and the Uptown/Gold Line at Bellaire/South Rice. According to what Metro reported to the local station, FOX 26, this line has received a federal Record of Decision, what it calls the final step necessary to build this line.
This route possibly may be extended another  to Northwest Mall. Also, another map shows that this line will be extended to the Hillcroft Transit Center and furthermore it appears a duplicate line will make its way from the Northwest Transit Center to the Eastwood Transit Center. Metro was promised by the Uptown Management District that $70 million of infrastructure improvements would be implemented in order to allow Metro to build this line; however, this has not come to pass and therefore Metro appears to keep the construction of the line in limbo for the present.

Countering the bad news regarding Metro's light rail expansion, the House of Representatives and the Senate passed bills allotting $150 million to the Red Line Extension and Southeast/Green Line light rail projects for fiscal year 2011. Added to the previous $150 million allotted fiscal year 2010, the total amount given to these projects is $300 million. However, according to the FTA, this will not be available to METRO unless they rebid the contract to build the new light rail cars. In light of this, Metro decided to build light rail only according to the funds they have while waiting to see if they will receive federal funds. Thus in late September 2010 Metro only came up with a figure of $143 million in funds available for construction.

Metro Solutions 
Metro Solutions is a large transportation and infrastructure plan that will be complete by 2020. Metro Solutions includes the following from Metro's website:
 Nearly  of Light Rail Transit –  known as University Line from Hillcroft to the University of Houston, Texas Southern University and, in the future, the Eastwood Transit Center;  covering the extension of the existing Red Line north to the Northline Transit Center; and the Southeast, East End, and Uptown lines.
  of Commuter Rail Transit (CRT) – along US-290 from Cypress Park & Ride to Intermodal Facility and along US-90A from Missouri City to Fannin South Park & Ride/Rail Station; and along Texas 3 to Galveston. As explained above, though, commuter rail appears to be out of the question for now regarding the US-90A route. In August 2010, Representative Al Green decided to push the matter of the US-90A route at a luncheon meeting. Metro's findings were brought up during the presentation with estimates of 12,000 people riding commuter rail when commenced and 23,000 by 2030. Also, another study brought up indicated that the population of Houston would increase by 3.5 million, or double (and then some) the current population. Green also gave words of thanks to those showing support since the measure to create commuter rail was passed in 2003. Metro and the FTA also intend to file an Environmental Impact Statement in accordance with the National Environmental Policy Act in 2011, outlining the purpose and need, alternatives, and various impacts of the project.
  of Signature Bus Service/Suburban Bus Rapid Transit – Southeast Transit Center to Texas Medical Center, Uptown to US 90A CRT line, Gessner and State Highway 249/Tidwell.
 10 New Transit Facilities – Northern Intermodal Facility serving different transit modes (Commuter Rail, Light Rail and BRT), five Transit Centers and four Park and Ride lots.
 HOV/HOT Conversion – modify one-way, reversible High Occupancy Vehicle (HOV) lanes to two-way High Occupancy Toll (HOT) lanes.

Metro Police 

Metro operates its own police department. With over 185 Texas peace officers and 88 non-sworn, civilian employees, the department's main goal is to ensure safety and security on the transit system. The department was established in 1982 and is accredited with the Commission on Accreditation for Law Enforcement Agencies (CALEA), one of only five public transit police departments in North America to be so.

State law grants Metro Police jurisdiction in the counties in which Metro is located, provides services, or is supported by a general sales and use tax. As peace officers, state law also grants Metro Police the power to arrest without warrant for any felony, breach of the peace, disorderly conduct or intoxication offense that is committed in their presence or view while in Texas. They may also make an arrest pursuant to a warrant anywhere in Texas.

Headquarters 

The Metro headquarters are in the Lee P. Brown Administration Building in Downtown Houston. The facility includes the Downtown Transit Center, a Metro Ride store, a Houston Police Department storefront and toilets for transiting passengers. The building was designed by Pierce Goodwin Alexander & Linville. As of August 2010, two floors of the building are not occupied and are not used in any way.

The building was scheduled to open in early 2004, coinciding with the beginning of the METRORail. The groundbreaking was held in 2002. Patti Muck, a spokesperson for METRO, said that the agency would save $273 million, assuming that the agency occupied the building for a 30-year span instead of renting for the same length of time. The Federal Transit Administration, a part of the federal government of the United States, paid 80% of the construction costs, while Metro paid the other 20%.

The “Houston in Harmony” mural l in honor of Mayor Lee P Brown was commissioned by the Honey Brown Hope Foundation and its founder, Tammie Lang Campbell, in 1999. It was moved March 23, 2005, to the Lee P. Brown Metropolitan Transit Authority Administration Building, where it is on permanent display.

Previously the Metro headquarters were in the Louisiana Place (now the Total Plaza), also in Downtown Houston. The agency occupied 10 floors in the building and did not receive any federal funds to cover the $3.8 million annual rent. The Metro Board Room was located on the 16th floor. Total Petrochemicals USA, a subsidiary of TotalEnergies, moved into the space that was previously occupied by METRO; the agency scheduled its move into the Brown building to occur in January 2005.

Ridership and demographics 

A Regional Fixed Route Transit Rider survey sponsored by the Houston-Galveston Area Council (H-GAC), in partnership with METRO, was completed in 2017. Over 22,000 riders were surveyed—the most expansive ever conducted on a regional basis—and included eight regional fixed-route transit agencies which operate in HGAC's eight-county region. The survey found that 58 percent of riders use transit to get to work, 20 percent use it for shopping or personal business, and about 10 percent of riders use a bus or train to get to school. 88 percent of riders reported that they rode transit at least three days per week with almost 50 percent of riders riding at least five days per week. The survey's findings concluded that 88 percent of all the trips were directly contributing to the region's economy.

Member cities 
The Metro member cities include:
Core city
 Houston

Other cities
 Bellaire
 Bunker Hill Village
 Conroe
 El Lago
 Hedwig Village
 Hilshire Village
 Humble
 Hunters Creek Village
 Katy
 Missouri City
 Piney Point Village
 Spring Valley Village
 Southside Place
 Taylor Lake Village
 West University Place

In addition the agency serves many unincorporated areas.

See also 

 List of tram and light-rail transit systems

References

Further reading 
 Spivak, Todd. "Run Over by Metro." Houston Press. March 3, 2006.

External links 

Metro Official Page

 
Bus transportation in Texas
METRORail
Transportation in Harris County, Texas
Transportation in Fort Bend County, Texas
Transit agencies in the United States